The 2019–20 Illinois Fighting Illini men's basketball team represented the University of Illinois at Urbana–Champaign in the 2019–20 NCAA Division I men's basketball season. Led by third-year head coach Brad Underwood, the Illini played their home games at State Farm Center in Champaign, Illinois as members of the Big Ten Conference. The Illini finished the season 21–10, 13–7 in Big Ten play to finish in fourth place. Their season ended following the cancellation of postseason tournaments due to the COVID-19 pandemic.

Previous season
The Illini finished the 2018–19 season 12–21, 7–13 in Big Ten play and finished in a three-way tie for 10th place. Due to the tie-breaking rules, they received the No. 11 seed in the Big Ten tournament where they defeated Northwestern in the first round before losing to Iowa in the second round.

Offseason

Departures

2019 recruiting class

Future recruits

2020–21 team recruits

Roster

Schedule and results

|-
!colspan=9 style="background:#; color:#;"|Exhibition

|-
!colspan=9 style="background:#; color:#;"|Regular season

|-
!colspan=9 style="background:#; color:#;"|Big Ten tournament
|-
!colspan=9 style=|Canceled
|-
!colspan=9 style="background:#; color:#;"|
|-
!colspan=9 style=|Canceled
|-

Source

Rankings

*AP does not release post-NCAA Tournament rankings

References

2019–20 Big Ten Conference men's basketball season
2018-19
2020 in sports in Illinois
2019 in sports in Illinois